Beijing City International School (BCIS) is an independent co-educational not-for-profit day school offering an international curriculum for toddler to twelfth grade students.

It has gained a spot as a prospective member of the European Council of International Schools (ECIS) and is a regular member of the Council of International Schools (CIS), being accredited by The Western Association of Schools and Colleges (WASC). BCIS is also an IB World school, as well as a member of the Association of China and Mongolia International Schools (ACAMIS). BCIS is fully authorized for the Primary Years Programme (PYP), Middle Years Programme (MYP) and the Diploma Programme (DP) with the International Baccalaureate Organization (IBO).

BCIS has two purpose-built campuses as of August 2014. The first is its 51,000 square meter main campus on Baiziwan Nan Er Rd, which serves as the home base for all students from Grades 1 to 12. Two of the school's three divisions, the Elementary School (Grades 1–5) and the Secondary School, are located on the main campus (Grades 6 to 12). The purpose-built Early Childhood Center (ECC) is located just one kilometer away at No. 11 Dongbai St (adjacent to Shuangjing Bridge) and serves students from Toddler to Kindergarten (age 2 to 6 years).

BCIS can offer enrollment not only to foreign students but also to Chinese national students, as the school is registered with the Education Committee of Chaoyang District.

History

The school opened in 2005 with fewer than 60 students in Kindergarten through Grade 6. The secondary school building opened the following year, and the first graduating class was in 2008. BCIS was also an Olympic Model Education School for the 2008 Summer Olympics in Beijing. BCIS graduated its first student in 2009. The school opened a second campus in August 2014, the purpose-built Early Childhood Center (ECC), which is located just 1 km west of the main campus and educates children from Toddler to Kindergarten.

Student life

Student Support Services 
BCIS provides students with Counseling, Learning Support, and University Guidance services.

Library 
BCIS has three libraries, one in each section of the school, namely the ECC, ES, and SS. Teacher librarians who are also experienced educators staff the library. They work with homeroom and subject teachers to incorporate library and information seeking skills into the curriculum, as well as plan and carry out reading and literature appreciation activities. In the ES library, a parent zone has been created to provide information and resources about supporting children's personal, social, and emotional development.

Athletics 
"BCIS is a full member of three sports conferences: The International Schools Athletic Conference (ISAC), which operates across Beijing and Tianjin; The Association of China and Mongolia International Schools (ACAMIS), which covers all of China and Mongolia; Junior International Schools Athletics Conference (JISAC), with membership from many international elementary schools in Beijing.Within these conferences, secondary school students have the opportunity to participate in soccer, volleyball, basketball teams over a season of approximately 8 weeks for each sport. There are also one-off tournaments in badminton, table tennis, tennis, cross-country running, golf and track & field athletics. Opportunities also exist for elementary students to enjoy seasons of soccer, European handball, T-ball / coach-pitch softball, as well as one-off tournaments for table tennis, mini-volleyball, badminton, and track & field athletics."

Enrichment Activities 
"BCIS Enrichment activities (EAs) aim to inspire and empower students to engage in authentic experiential learning activities complementing their curricular learning. EAs substantiate BCIS’s balanced holistic education, which encourages the discovery of lifelong interests and striving to always do one’s best. Opportunities for social growth, where students engage with like-minded community members, result from these rich, authentic experiences."

Tuition

In 2015 the tuition for the year was 220,000 renminbi ($35,442 U.S. dollars). China Daily ranked Beijing City as the 6th most expensive private school in Beijing.

Academics

BCIS offers all three programs of the International Baccalaureate Organization (IBO) - International Baccalaureate Primary Years Programme (IB PYP), International Baccalaureate Middle Years Programme (IB MYP), IB Diploma Programme (IB DP). 
Courses at BCIS are taught in English while offering three first language courses: English, Chinese or Korean. Second Language includes English, Chinese and Spanish.

Students in their second semester of Grade 10 have the opportunity to decide which diploma they want to pursue in Grade 11 and 12. The choices are the IB Diploma Programme diploma, and BCIS's high school diploma  (known as IDEATE program).

IDEATE Program 
IDEATE challenges students to pursue their own ideas and transform their learning through meaningful educational pursuits. It is designed to celebrate and develop students’ strengths, talents, and skills in ways that will support any future aspirations. Flexibility within the program allows for a personalized avenue towards post-secondary education and a chance to focus on areas of their choosing. IDEATE will challenge and inspire students to achieve their potential.

Accreditation

BCIS is an IB World school that has been approved by the International Baccalaureate to develop and deliver courses under the IB Primary Years Programme, IB Middle Years Programme, and IB Diploma Programme. The Council of International Schools and the Western Association of Schools and Colleges both accredit BCIS (WASC). Because the school is registered with the Education Committee of Chaoyang District, BCIS can accept both foreign and Chinese national students.

References

External links
 

Schools in Chaoyang District, Beijing
Association of China and Mongolia International Schools
International schools in Beijing
International Baccalaureate schools in China